The Alfred Paull House is a historic house located at 467 Weir Street in Taunton, Massachusetts.

Description and history 
It is a two-story, wood-framed structure, roughly square in shape, with a tall bell-cast mansard roof. A porch extends across the front and around to one side, with chamfered posts and a decorative valance with curved pendant brackets. Similar brackets adorn the main roof cornice. The house was built in about 1860 by Alfred Paull, who was, along with his brother James, a leading developer of the area. It is one of the city's most ornate Second Empire houses.

The house was listed on the National Register of Historic Places on July 5, 1984.

See also
National Register of Historic Places listings in Taunton, Massachusetts

References

National Register of Historic Places in Taunton, Massachusetts
Houses in Taunton, Massachusetts
Houses on the National Register of Historic Places in Bristol County, Massachusetts
Second Empire architecture in Massachusetts